Giacomo La Rosa (born August 25, 1946 in Messina) is a retired Italian professional football player.

He played for 5 seasons (33 games, 7 goals) in the Serie A for A.S. Roma, S.S. Lazio and Delfino Pescara 1936.

1946 births
Living people
Italian footballers
Serie A players
A.C.R. Messina players
A.S. Roma players
S.S.D. Varese Calcio players
S.S. Lazio players
Palermo F.C. players
U.S. Catanzaro 1929 players
Delfino Pescara 1936 players
U.S. Salernitana 1919 players
Sportspeople from Messina
Association football forwards
Footballers from Sicily
A.S.D. Civitavecchia 1920 players